The 2009 Meijer Indy 300 presented by Red Baron and Edy's was the twelfth round of the 2009 IndyCar Series season, and was held on August 1, 2009 at the  Kentucky Speedway in Sparta, Kentucky.

Grid

Race

Standings after the race 

Drivers' Championship standings

References 

Meijer Indy 300
Meijer Indy 300
Meijer Indy 300
Kentucky Indy 300